Zuvand may refer to:
Köhnə Zuvand ("Old Zuvand"), Azerbaijan
Yeni Zuvand ("New Zuvand"), Azerbaijan
 Zuvand District, former name of Lerik District, Azerbaijan
Zuvand National Park, Azerbaijan